A FIDE flag player is a chess player who is unaffiliated with any national federation, and thus does not officially play for any country or national federation in FIDE-sanctioned tournaments. The flag takes its name from the French acronym for International Chess Federation or World Chess Federation (Fédération Internationale des Échecs)

Alireza Firouzja is among the notable players who played under the FIDE flag. He formerly represented Iran but opted to play as a neutral athlete under FIDE in 2019 due to Iran's sports policy of boycotting Israel. He eventually transferred to France's federation in 2021.

Ian Nepomniachtchi of Russia was speculated to be required to play under the FIDE flag in the World Chess Championship 2021 due to the World Anti-Doping Agency's sanctions against Russia in the Olympics and tournaments considered as world championships. He officially played for the Chess Federation of Russia (CFR) instead with a flag bearing the CFR's logo and abbreviation. He competed under the FIDE flag at the 2022 Candidates tournament following FIDE's suspension of the Russian and Belarusian teams from international competition in the wake of the Russian invasion of Ukraine.

See also
List of FIDE federation player transfers
Independent Olympians at the Olympic Games

References

Independent athletes
 
Chess terminology